Gastón Gil Romero (born 6 May 1993) is an Argentine footballer currently playing for Atlético Tucumán.

Career 

He made his debut in the 2011–12 season. He scored his first professional goal at 8 August 2013 against All Boys. It was the only goal in a home win.

References

External links
 

1993 births
Living people
Argentine footballers
Argentine expatriate footballers
Association football midfielders
Estudiantes de La Plata footballers
Rosario Central footballers
C.D. Universidad Católica del Ecuador footballers
Club Atlético Patronato footballers
Club Atlético Belgrano footballers
Aldosivi footballers
Atlético Tucumán footballers
Argentine Primera División players
Ecuadorian Serie A players
Argentine expatriate sportspeople in Ecuador
Expatriate footballers in Ecuador
People from General Roca